The Utah Inland Port is a proposed dry port in the northwest quadrant of Salt Lake City, Utah and other undeveloped land in Salt Lake County. It is currently in the planning and pre-construction stages. It would cover over 16,000 acres.

The Utah Inland Port Authority is a government-run corporation with the responsibility and legal powers to develop and run the Utah Inland Port. As of August 2022, its current executive director is Ben Hart. The Port Authority is governed by a Port Authority Board. Per Utah Code, seven board members are appointed, and four hold their post ex officio The current board chair is Salt Lake City Councilman James Rogers; its previous chair was Derek Miller, chair of the Salt Lake Chamber of Commerce.

History
In 2016, the University of Utah submitted an assessment regarding a potential inland port in the Salt Lake City area. Funded by the World Trade Center Utah and the Governor's Office of Economic Development, the report found the potential for strong economic benefits, including high-paying job opportunities, and rural economic development. It also found a need to perform additional studies on environmental impacts and the effect on tax revenues.

Also in 2016, Governor Gary Herbert created an Inland Port Exploratory Committee to "drive the development" of an inland port in Utah. At the time, he stated that "despite anti-trade, isolationist rhetoric at the national level, Utah remains committed to promoting international trade."

The Inland Port Authority and Inland Port were created as legal entities by the Utah State Legislature, in bill SB234, in 2018.  The boundaries of the port were first spelled out at this time, amounting to about 16,000 acres.

In 2019, HB0433 significantly broadened the Inland Port Authority's reach. The proposed boundaries amount to approximately one-third of Salt Lake City's land area.

On March 11, 2019, Salt Lake City Mayor Jackie Biskupski and the Salt Lake City's Attorney's Office brought a lawsuit against the port, challenging the legality of the legislation underlying the port's creation. On January 9, 2020, the presiding judge rejected the city's claims and dismissed the case. The city's new mayor, Erin Mendenhall, called the decision a "disappointment" but stated she planned to appeal the decision to the state Supreme Court.  The Utah State Supreme Court heard oral arguments from both parties in April 2021. In June 2022, the Utah Supreme Court ruled the port’s existence was not unconstitutional and continued development could proceed.

In September 2022, the Port Authority announced it would “pause… all major capital projects” until it develops a “Northwest Quadrant Master Development Plan.”

Protests

In April 2019, environmental activists disrupted the port board's monthly meeting.

In May 2019, environmental advocates demonstrated against the port.

On June 5, 2019, protestors disrupted the Inland Port Authority board meeting.

On July 9, 2019, about 100 protestors stormed the Salt Lake Chamber of Commerce building to protest the port. Fourteen were later charged with riot and criminal trespass after the protests turned violent.

On August 14, 2019, a "working group" meeting was disrupted by protestors.

On October 17, 2019, activists again protested the Inland Port Authority public board meeting.

On September 20, 2021, Protestors gathered outside of the 111 main office of the Port Authority and managed to postpone a meeting designated to create a Public Infrastructure District (PID).

Criticisms and controversy

Loss of local control

Salt Lake City leaders have argued that the State Legislature is unfairly taking control of local land. SB 234 gave the Inland Port Authority administrative authority over all land-use decisions, and the power to capture 100 percent of newly generated taxes within the inland port borders. This would amount to millions of dollars in tax revenue that would not be captured by Salt Lake City for local property taxes.

City leaders also assert that the creation of the inland port would take tax revenue that would otherwise have gone to Salt Lake City schools and libraries.  The Utah League of Cities & Towns called the creation of the Inland Port Authority "nothing short of a state takeover of a swath of Salt Lake City without the city's consent." Prior to the passage of SB 234, Salt Lake City had approved a master plan that governed the development of the inland port area, as well as agreements with northwest quadrant landowners committing to reinvest tax revenues into the area to aid development. That master plan and agreements would be superseded by the creation of the inland port.

The Salt Lake County Council was not consulted during negotiations over SB 234. The County Council asked Governor Herbert to veto the bill.

HB 433 allowed the Inland Port Authority to expand its reach outside of the boundaries currently set, and prohibited any city from bringing legal action against the port, or any other challenge to the authority's creation or existence. In the runup to its passage, Jackie Biskupski stated "this bill effectively creates a government entity, not only unaccountable to the community but immune from judicial scrutiny, closing the courtroom door to local communities." Supporters of the bill stated its goal was to allow other interested cities or counties to join the port project.

The land the proposed port would be built on was once considered sacred by the Shoshone, Ute and Goshute Indian tribes.

Lack of transparency and conflicts of interest

The bill establishing the Inland Port was passed by the Utah Legislature with broad changes from earlier versions with little time for public comment and review. The bill was discussed for only 15 minutes on the floor of the state legislature. "The citizens of the Westpointe Community Council, which encompasses most of the [area of the inland port], believe the Legislature's late introduction of this bill (SB234) is by design to impede fair and proper citizen and stakeholder due process," said Terry Thomas, vice chairman of the community council.

Greg Hughes, who was the Speaker of the Utah House of Representatives when HB 234 was passed, appointed himself as an Inland Port board member. Less than a week later, he resigned from this position, after it was discovered that he owned property which was close enough to the port boundaries to have legally disqualified him from being on the board in the first place.

In August 2018, board members voted 9-2 against making board subcommittee meetings available for public access. Eventually the board did away with subcommittee meetings altogether.

The board's ex-chair, Derek Miller - who is also the chair of the Salt Lake Chamber of Commerce - sent an email in October 2019 inviting a national rail business a spot on the chamber's "exclusive" Inland Port Committee, in exchange for $10,000. Critics have suggested this represents a "pay-to-play" impropriety. Miller later called the fundraising email a mistake.

Environmental issues

The Inland Port is located in non-attainment zones for several airborne pollutants, meaning that current air quality standards are not met. Critics argue that the presence of an inland port would increase diesel truck traffic in the area and therefore further exacerbate poor air quality in Utah. Also, language adopted in the Utah code makes it difficult to regulate natural resources moving through the Inland Port; critics fear the port's presence would ease the export of coal, thus increasing its usage and associated environmental impacts including climate change. 

State Senator Luz Escamilla introduced a bill in the Utah state legislature that would fund the Utah Department of Environmental Quality to install air and water monitors at the site of the proposed port, to establish baseline readings for future comparison.

No official environmental impact study has been completed, although Miller had stated one would be complete by the first quarter of 2019. A final draft of the port's overall business plan - with an environmental sustainability plan included - was released in May 2020. It was approved unanimously by the board the next month despite negative public comments.

The Great Salt Lake is currently at half of its historical size; the shrinkage can be attributed directly to withdrawals for industrial, agricultural and economic activities. Additionally, the ecosystem surrounding the lake is considered to be under severe stress due to the falling water levels and other human activities. Environmental advocates are concerned the port's presence would increase the environmental pressures on the ecosystem and increase water expenditures. Millions of migratory birds also use the land as a stopover point yearly.

Traffic congestion
A critical analysis estimates the Inland Port's presence could create about 11,600 new truck trips and 23,000 additional car trips daily, at half of the Port's developable potential. "By way of comparison, the total number of daily vehicle trips on I-80 between downtown and the [Salt Lake City International] airport was about 42,000 in 2017," the report states. "This traffic would not only affect I-80 but also I-15 and other streets serving the Port area, including Bangerter Highway and 5600 West."

References

External links

Dry ports
Ports and harbors of the United States